Konstantin Sergeyevich Sarsania (11 June 1968 – 7 October 2017) was a Russian professional football coach, player, and agent. At the time of his death he worked as director of sports for FC Zenit Saint Petersburg.

Career
He made his debut as a player in the Soviet Second League in 1988 for FC Dynamo-2 Moscow. He was a licensed FIFA player agent since 1998 and represented, among others, Vyacheslav Malafeev, Aleksandr Pavlenko and Vitaliy Denisov.

In October 2009, he was appointed the new director of sports for FC Dynamo Moscow. His official contract started in 2010. In August 2010, he was appointed the head coach of FC Fakel Voronezh, and due to a technicality (the same person can't be registered for two professional teams at the same time), had to be un-registered from his Dynamo Moscow post, even though he continued to serve his duties of that position as well as coaching Fakel. He was dismissed from his position as director of sports with Dynamo Moscow on December 6, 2010, officially to focus on his Fakel coaching position.

References

1968 births
2017 deaths
Soviet footballers
Russian footballers
Association football defenders
FC Dynamo Moscow reserves players
FC Fakel Voronezh players
FC Spartak Vladikavkaz players
FC Asmaral Moscow players
USL Dunkerque players
Soviet expatriate footballers
Russian expatriate footballers
Expatriate footballers in France
Russian football managers
Association football agents
FC Khimki managers
Russian Premier League managers
FC Fakel Voronezh managers
FK Atlantas managers
Russian expatriate football managers
Expatriate football managers in Lithuania
Russian expatriate sportspeople in Lithuania
FC Zenit Saint Petersburg non-playing staff
Russian people of Abkhazian descent